The 2018 VOO-Tour de Wallonie was a five-stage men's professional road cycling race, held in Belgium as a 2.HC race on the 2018 UCI Europe Tour. It was the forty-fifth running of the Tour de Wallonie, starting on 28 July in La Louvière and finishing on 1 August in Waremme.

Schedule

Teams
Twenty teams entered the race. Each team had a maximum of seven riders:

Stages

Stage 1
28 July 2018 — La Louvière to Les Bons Villers,

Stage 2
29 July 2018 — Villers-la-Ville to Namur,

Stage 3
30 July 2018 — Chimay to La Roche-en-Ardenne,

Stage 4
31 July 2018 — Malmedy to Herstal,

Stage 5
1 August 2018 — Huy to Waremme,

Classification leadership table
In the 2018 Tour de Wallonie, five different jerseys were awarded. The general classification was calculated by adding each cyclist's finishing times on each stage, and allowing time bonuses for the first three finishers at intermediate sprints (three seconds to first, two seconds to second and one second to third) and at the finish of all stages to the first three finishers: the stage winner won a ten-second bonus, with six and four seconds for the second and third riders respectively. The leader of the classification received a yellow jersey; it was considered the most important of the 2018 Tour de Wallonie, and the winner of the classification was considered the winner of the race.

There was also a mountains classification, the leadership of which was marked by a white jersey. In the mountains classification, points towards the classification were won by reaching the top of a climb before other cyclists. Each climb was categorised as either first, or second-category, with more points available for the higher-categorised climbs.

Additionally, there was a points classification, which awarded a green jersey. In the points classification, cyclists received points for finishing in the top 10 in a stage. For winning a stage, a rider earned 25 points, with 20 for second, 15 for third, 10 for fourth and so on, down to 1 point for 10th place. There was also a separate classification for the intermediate sprints, rewarding a purple jersey. Points towards the classification were accrued – awarded on a 5–3–1 scale – at intermediate sprint points during each stage; these intermediate sprints also offered bonus seconds towards the general classification as noted above.

Finally, the leader in the classification for young riders, wore a red bib number. This was decided the same way as the general classification, but only riders born after 28 July 1995 were eligible to be ranked in the classification. There was also a team classification, in which the times of the best three cyclists per team on each stage were added together; the leading team at the end of the race was the team with the lowest total time.

 In stage two, Michael Van Staeyen, who was second in the points classification, wore the green jersey, because first placed Romain Cardis wore the yellow jersey as leader of the general classification.
 In stage three, Romain Cardis, who was second in the points classification, wore the green jersey, because first placed Tim Wellens wore the yellow jersey as leader of the general classification.
 In stage five, Romain Cardis, who was second in the points classification, wore the green jersey, because first placed Quinten Hermans wore the yellow jersey as leader of the general classification.

Notes

References

Sources

External links
  
 

2018
2018 UCI Europe Tour
2018 in Belgian sport
July 2018 sports events in Belgium
August 2018 sports events in Belgium